Ioannis Kalargaris (Greek: Ιωαννης Καλαργαρης; born 6 June 1990 in Athens, Greece) is a Greek swimmer specializing in freestyle. He competed in the 50 m event at the 2012 Summer Olympics.

References

External links
 

1990 births
Swimmers from Athens
Living people
Greek male swimmers
Greek male freestyle swimmers
Olympic swimmers of Greece
Swimmers at the 2012 Summer Olympics
Mediterranean Games silver medalists for Greece
Mediterranean Games bronze medalists for Greece
Mediterranean Games medalists in swimming
Swimmers at the 2009 Mediterranean Games